Serve the People is a 2022 South Korean romantic drama film,  written and directed by Jang Cheol-soo and starring Yeon Woo-jin, Ji An (지안), Jo Sung-ha and Kim Ji-chul. Based on the eponymous novel by Chinese writer Yan Lianke, it depicts a romance between Mu Gwang, a model soldier, and Su-ryun, the young wife of the division commander and the inner conflicts of Mu Gwang. The film set in a fictional socialist country much similar to North Korea in the 1970s, was released theatrically on February 23, 2022 in South Korea.

Synopsis
Explaining the meaning of title the director of the film said, "The supreme leader has given the soldier the duty written on the sign to serve the people, and the ear of barley engraved next to it symbolizes a bountiful harvest and the red star symbolizes a brilliant future. The division commander values this sign more than life. And he said the same to Mu-gwang, the first to go to work. Su-ryun uses this sign to create rifts and widen the gaps. The language of revolution is replaced by the language of desire. It becomes a medium of love."

Cast
 Yeon Woo-jin as Mu-gwang 
 Ji An as Soo-ryeon
 Jo Sung-ha as Division commander
 Kim Ji-chul as Company commander
 Park Jung-eon as Instructor's wife
 Woo Ju-bin as Veteran soldier
 Han Min-yeop as Driver
 Jang Hae-min as Mu-gwang's wife
 Han Il-gyu as battalion commander

Production
In July 2013, the film was planned based on the novel Serve the People! by the Chinese novelist Yan Lianke. Director Jang Cheol-soo was assigned direction of the film and Yeon Woo-jin was offered the lead role of a soldier, who while struggling between class differences and sexual desire, succumbs to the temptation of his boss's wife.

In an interview the lead actor Yeon Woo-jin said that he had read the script back in 2014, but the filming began in 2020. In September 2020, it was reported that Yeon Woo-jin and Jian has been cast in  the film Serve the People directed by Jang Cheol-soo and produced by Leopard Film Company. Serve the People is a comeback film of Ji An, who is appearing after 5 years. Her last film was The Way in 2017.

Reception

Box office
The film was released on 595 screens on February 23, 2022. On the opening day the film ranked at number 4 on the Korean box office.

 it is at 15th place among all the Korean films released in the year 2022, with gross of US$562,357 and 74,138 admissions.

Critical response 
Kim Mi-hwa of Star News criticized the presentation of the film, writing, "the content of satire and resistance to the original system was not well expressed in the film". She further stated that the depiction of sex scenes "continues for a long time" and "the subject matter this film was trying to talk about in the first place becomes more and more distant." Kim found the character Soo-Ryun, played by actress Ji-An, "disappointing" as "it feels hard and awkward without knowing where it is". Concluding her review Kim opined, "Serving the People seems to be difficult to leave behind more than a problematic work."

Yang Yu-jin of My Daily in her review, termed the film as "A problematic work that shakes emotions by going back and forth between reason and instinct seeks the audience." She praised the performances of lead pair writing, "Yeon Woo-jin and Ji-an's challenging spirit stand out." Yang further stated, "in particular, Yeon Woo-jin's acting transformation is impressive." Concluding Yang wrote, that the film conveyed the impression that the heavy theme of anti-socialism has been somewhat volatilized, and it is only a description of exceptional 19-karat gold [sex scenes]."

Lee Bora of Cine21 reviewing the film stated that the endeavour was made to show the setting of the film in fiction world "with imagination added based on the tone of the characters and the overall mise-en-scène." Bora opined, that the conflict between the protagonists, "who go back and forth between reality and desire, is produced very stiffly". Bora felt that the narrative of the film was not tightly woven, it felt "as if a screw is missing". Bora concluded, "the focus of [the film] is on sexuality rather than love.

References

External links
 
 
 
 

2022 films
2020s South Korean films
2020s Korean-language films
2022 romantic drama films
South Korean erotic drama films
South Korean erotic romance films
South Korean romantic drama films
Films based on Chinese novels
Films directed by Jang Cheol-soo
Films set in a fictional country
Films set in 1976
Adultery in films
Films about socialism
Films about military personnel